Byske is a locality situated in Skellefteå Municipality, Västerbotten County, Sweden with 1,752 inhabitants in 2013.

References 

Fishing for Salmon is allowed until the 31st of August. Until the 18th of June it is catch and release only, meaning all fishes caught, dead or alive, must be released back into the river.

Land owners* who holds a fishing right are allowed to kill and keep salmon during the period 1 January until 31 August.

Between 1 August and 31 August you're only allowed to keep salmon within the length of 50–63 cm. All other catches of salmon must be released into the river with no exceptions.

You're only allowed to keep sea trout within the length of 50–63 cm throughout the season. All other catches of sea trout must be released into the river with no exceptions.

Minimum size for salmon is 50 centimeters and for sea trout it's 50 centimeters.

Bag limit: 1 salmon or sea trout/day and 5 salmons & 5 sea trouts/year.

When a salmon or a sea trout are killed the angler is obliged to practice catch and release for the remaining day (until time 24:00).

The bag limit for Grayling is five per day and angler and the minimum size is 35 cm.

During June all fishing is forbidden from 06.00 - 18.00 between the blue bridge (the bridge in to the village) and the cablebridge of wood. In the same area only single hooks are allowed for all fishing methods during June.

All fishing is forbidden in Byske river and the tributaries from 1 September until 31 December.

For land owners* all fishing is forbidden in Byske river and the tributaries from 1 September until 14 October.

The person who´s name is registered on a property of land which includes a fishing right.

Foul hooked fish must be released.

You are obliged to report your catch of trout and salmon exceeding the minimum size within 24 hours.

Catch and release pointers. Keep the fish on the water while gently removing the hook. Hold the fish upright in the stream and wait until the fish is ready to swim away. Never touch a fish with dry hands.

Inspection fees
The fishing in contravention of the prohibitions or conditions in Byske River fishing district will be required to control charge:

Killed salmon bow June 19, 4400:-
Violation current 5 salmon / year and 5 trout / year, 4400:-
Killed salmon over 63 cm in August, 4400:-
The killing of Foul hooked fish, 1100:-
Fishing in closed area under not permitted time (blue bridge-suspension bridge), 2200:-
Fishing with more than a single hook on the route Blue bridge - suspension bridge in June, 1100:-
Not filed catch report, 1100:-
Not had a valid fishing license, 300:-
More than 2 meters tippet length at spinn flyfishing, 1100:-
Not authorized catch report, all fields must be completed, height and or weight shall be indicated, 1100:-
Fishing after September 1, 4400:-
Killed trout over 63 cm, 4400:-

Rules 2017 pdf
PM Rules English 2017 (pdf)

Byskeälvens FVO

Det största fiskevårdsområdet Rapporter Samverka

Populated places in Västerbotten County
Populated places in Skellefteå Municipality